Yamunotri, also Jamnotri, is the source of the Yamuna River and the seat of the Goddess Yamuna in Hinduism. It is one of the four sites in India's Chhota Char Dham pilgrimage. The sacred shrine of Yamunotri, source of the river Yamuna, is the westernmost shrine in the Garhwal Himalayas, perched atop a flank of Bandar Poonch Parvat. The chief attraction at Yamunotri is the temple devoted to the Goddess Yamuna and the holy thermal springs at Janki Chatti which is 7 km away.

The actual source, a frozen lake of ice and glacier (Champasar Glacier) located on the Kalind Mountain at a height of 4,421 m above sea level, about 1 km further up, is not frequented generally as it is not accessible; hence the shrine has been located on the foot of the hill. The approach is extremely difficult and pilgrims therefore offer puja at the temple itself.

The temple of Yamuna, on the left bank of the Yamuna, was constructed by Maharaja Pratap Shah of Tehri Garhwal. The deity is made of black marble. The Yamuna, like the Ganges, has been elevated to the status of a divine mother for the Hindus and has been held responsible for nurturing and developing the Indian civilization.

There are hot water springs located close to the temple. Surya Kund is the most important kund. Near the Surya Kund there is a shila called Divya Shila, which is worshipped before puja is offered to the deity. Devotees prepare rice and potatoes, tied in muslin cloth, to offer at the shrine by dipping them in these hot water springs. The cooked rice is taken back home as prasadam. The pujaris of Yamunotri come from the village of Kharsali near Janki Chatti. They are the administrators of the sacred place and perform religious rites. They are well-versed in the Shastras.

History and legends

According to the ancient legend, sage Asit Muni had his hermitage here. All his life, he bathed daily both in the Ganges and the Yamuna. Unable to go to Gangotri during his old age, a stream of the Ganges appeared opposite Yamunotri for him.

Sangya is the birthplace of the Yamuna in the Champasar Glacier (4,421 m) just below the Banderpoonch Mountain. The mountain adjacent to the river source is dedicated to her father, and is called Kalind Parvat, (Kalind being another name for the sun deity - Surya). Yamuna is known for her frivolousness, a trait that she developed because, according to a common story, Yamuna's mother could never make eye contact with her dazzling husband.

Geography

Yamuna River

The actual source of Yamuna River lies in the Yamunotri Glacier, at a height , near the Bandarpunch peaks in the Lower Himalayas and is dedicated to goddess Yamuna. It crosses the states of Uttarakhand, Haryana, Uttar Pradesh, Himachal Pradesh and later Delhi before merging with the Ganges at Triveni Sangam, Prayagraj.

Yamunotri Temple

Yamunotri Temple is situated in the western region of Garhwal Himalayas at an altitude of  near the river source. The temple was built in 1839 by Sundarshan Shah who was the king of the cultural center of Tehri. There was a small shrine at the site prior to the construction of the temple. The Divya Shila and Surya Kund are located near the temple.

See also
Gangotri
Chhota Char Dham
Uttarkashi district

References

Hindu pilgrimage sites in India
Yamuna River
Geography of Uttarkashi district
Hindu holy cities
Glaciers of Uttarakhand